Jangal Mariala railway station (Urdu and ) is located in Jangal Mariala village, Khanewal district of Punjab province of the Pakistan.

See also
 List of railway stations in Pakistan
 Pakistan Railways

References

External links

Railway stations in Punjab, Pakistan
Railway stations on Lodhran–Khanewal Branch Line